Harry Wills (May 15, 1889 – December 21, 1958) was a heavyweight boxer who held the World Colored Heavyweight Championship three times. Many boxing historians consider Wills the most egregious victim of the "color line" drawn by white heavyweight champions.  Wills fought for over twenty years (1911–1932), and was ranked as the number one challenger for the throne, but was denied the opportunity to fight for the title. Of all the black contenders between the heavyweight championship reigns of Jack Johnson and Joe Louis, Wills came closest to securing a title shot. BoxRec ranks him among 10 best heavyweights in the world from 1913 to 1924, and as No.1 heavyweight from 1915 to 1917.

His managers included Jim Buckley and Paddy Mullins.

Boxing career

Wills fought many of the top heavyweights of his era.  He defeated Willie Meehan, who had decisioned Jack Dempsey, Gunboat Smith and Charley Weinart.  He also fought Luis Firpo in a match that ended in a no decision.  Wills faced future heavyweight champion Jack Sharkey in 1926, and was being decisively beaten when he was disqualified.  The next year, Wills was knocked out by heavyweight contender Paolino Uzcudun in a bout that signalled the end of his reign as a serious title contender.  His final record was 75 wins (with 47 knockouts), 9 losses and 2 draws.  In 2003, he was named to the Ring Magazine's list of 100 greatest punchers of all time.

The top black fighters of Wills' era were forced to continuously fight each other, as many white fighters also drew the "color line".  As a result, Wills fought the redoubtable Sam Langford 22 times.  His record against Langford was 6 wins, 2 losses and 14 no decisions, although the two losses were by knockout.  He beat Langford three times for the colored heavyweight title, with Langford winning it back twice. (He was forced to vacate his third title when he fought Jack Sharkey in 1926 and was lost the bout due to a disqualification.) Wills also defeated colored heavyweight champ Sam McVey three times and fought two no-decision bouts with Joe Jeanette.

In May 1922, the New York Daily News polled its readers, asking them to choose Dempsey's next title opponent. Over 45,000 readers responded, and Wills finished first with 12,177 votes. Dempsey initially said he was willing to fight Wills, but the bout was never scheduled.

Aborted 1926 Dempsey-Wills heavyweight title match
Midwestern boxing promoter Floyd Fitzsimmons rendered a check to Wills for his fee, but failed to produce even a downpayment for Dempsey's much larger fee for a bout between the two fighters, who had, in July 1925, signed an agreement for a 1926 title match, which never materialized as a result. Disagreement has existed among boxing historians as to whether Dempsey had avoided Wills—though Dempsey swore he was willing to fight him—as having said he would no longer fight Black boxers after winning the title. Wills twice attempted to sue Dempsey for breach of contract over the canceled bout, which had also been barred in New York State on orders from Governor Alfred E. Smith by Athletic Commissioner James Farley, an early champion of African-American equal rights due to his public threats to resign from the Athletic Commission if Wills was not given the fight against the champion Dempsey, as Farley deemed Wills the number one contender. A deadly race riot in the wake of Jack Johnson vs. James J. Jeffries also created reluctance to promote the match.  The stand taken by Commissioner Farley would help enable Farley to add the African American vote to the New Deal coalition as Franklin D. Roosevelt 's campaign manager and subsequently Chairman of the Democratic National Committee from the Republican Party, which had traditionally up until the 1930s controlled the African American voting block as the party of Lincoln.

Retirement
Wills retired from boxing in 1932, and ran a successful real estate business in Harlem, New York.  He was known for his yearly fast, in which, once a year, he would subsist on water for a month.  Wills admitted that his biggest regret in life was never getting the opportunity to fight Dempsey for the title.  Wills was confident that he would have won such a match.

Wills died at Jewish Memorial Hospital in New York City of complications from diabetes on December 21, 1958.

Legacy and honors
In 2020 award-winning author Mark Allen Baker published the first comprehensive account of The World Colored Heavyweight Championship, 1876-1937, with McFarland & Company, a leading independent publisher of academic & nonfiction books. This history traces the advent and demise of the Championship, the stories of the talented professional athletes who won it, and the demarcation of the color line both in and out of the ring.

For decades the World Colored Heavyweight Championship was a useful tool to combat racial oppression-the existence of the title a leverage mechanism, or tool, used as a technique to counter a social element, “drawing the color line.”

Harry Wills was inducted into the  International Boxing Hall of Fame  in 1992.

Professional boxing record
All information in this section is derived from BoxRec, unless otherwise stated.

Official record

All newspaper decisions are officially regarded as “no decision” bouts and are not counted in the win/loss/draw column.

Unofficial record

Record with the inclusion of newspaper decisions in the win/loss/draw column.

References

External links

1889 births
1958 deaths
Heavyweight boxers
African-American boxers
Boxers from Louisiana
Sportspeople from New Orleans
World colored heavyweight boxing champions
International Boxing Hall of Fame inductees
American male boxers
20th-century African-American people